The Roman Catholic Diocese of Calahorra y La Calzada-Logroño is a diocese located in the cities of Calahorra, Santo Domingo de la Calzada, and Logroño in the ecclesiastical province of Pamplona y Tudela in Spain.

There are cathedrals in Calahorra, Santo Domingo de la Calzada and Logroño.

Names
In 463, the Diocese of Calahorra was established. In 1232, "y La Calzada" was added. It became the Diocese of Calahorra y La Calzada – Logroño on 9 March 1959.

Bishops

To 1453
Rodrigo de Cascante (1170–1190)
Bishop García (1190–?)
Juan de Préjano (1197–1202)
Juan García de Agoncilo (1207–1216)
Guillermo Durán y Rodrigo de Basín (1217–1221)
Juan Pérez (1226 Appointed – 1237 Died)
Jerónimo Aznar (1238–1263)
Vivián (1263–1273)
Esteban de Sepúlveda (1273–1280)
Rodrigo Jiménez (1281–1282)
Martín García (1283–1286) Appointed Bishop of Astorga
Bishop Blas (1286–1287)
Juan Almoravid (5 Jan 1287 – 9 Jun 1300) Appointed Archbishop of Sevilla
Fernando González (13 Jun 1300 – 6 May 1303)
Rodrigo Ordóñez (1304–1311)
Miguel Romero de Yanguas (1313–1325)
Juan de Santo Domingo (1326–1346)
Pedro (1346–1347)
Lope de Fontecha (1348–1351)
Fernando Manuel (1352–1362)
Robert Le Coq (1362–1373)
Gonzalo Mena Roelas (16 Nov 1373 – 11 Aug 1382) Appointed Bishop of Burgos
Juan de Villacreces (1382–1394)
Juan Ramírez de Guzmán (1394 Jan 28 – 1403 Jul 30) Appointed Bishop of Avila
Fernando Manuel (1403–1408)
Diego López de Zúñiga (1408–1443)
Pedro López de Miranda (1443–1453)

1453–1953
Pedro González de Mendoza (28 Nov 1453 – 30 Oct 1467 Appointed, Bishop of Sigüenza)
Rodrigo Sánchez de Arévalo (1468–1469) Appointed Bishop of Palencia
Juan Diaz de Coca (13 Feb 1470 – 12 Mar 1477 Died)
Pedro Aranda (1477 – 1494 Died)
Juan Ortega Bravo de la Laguna (6 Sep 1499 – 5 May 1503 Appointed, Bishop of Coria)
Fadrique de Portugal Noreña, O.S.B. (5 May 1503 – 22 Dec 1508 Appointed, Bishop of Segovia)
Juan Fernández Velasco (22 Dec 1505 – 22 Jul 1514 Appointed, Bishop of Palencia)
Jaime Serra i Cau (5 Jul 1514 – 25 May 1515 Resigned)
Juan Castellanos de Villalba (25 May 1515 – 23 Aug 1522 Died)
Alonso de Castilla Zúniga (11 Mar 1523 – 8 Feb 1541 Died)
Antonio Ramírez de Haro (27 Jun 1541 – 6 Aug 1543 Appointed, Bishop of Segovia)
Juan Yanes (24 Sep 1543 – 24 Dec 1544 Died)
Juan Bernal Díaz de Luco (17 Apr 1545 – 6 Sep 1556 Died)
Diego Fernández de Córdoba Velasco (1 Oct 1557 – 15 Sep 1558 Died)
Juan Quiñones Guzmán (2 Aug 1559 – 14 Sep 1576 Died)
Juan Ochoa Salazar (11 Sep 1577 – 7 Aug 1587 Appointed, Bishop of Plasencia)
Antonio Manrique, O.F.M. (7 Aug 1587 – 30 Jan 1589 Died)
Pedro Portocarrero (bishop) (20 Mar 1589 – 12 Jan 1594 Appointed, Bishop of Córdoba)
Pedro Manso Zuñiga (23 Mar 1594 – 12 Sep 1612 Died)
Pedro Zamora (29 Jul 1613 – 4 Oct 1613 Died)
Pedro González del Castillo (17 Feb 1614 – 5 Aug 1627 Died)
Miguel Ayala (5 May 1628 – 19 Aug 1632 Died)
Gonzalo Chacón Velasco y Fajardo (31 Jan 1633 – 27 May 1642 Died)
Juan Piñeiro Osorio (13 Jul 1643 – 21 Oct 1647 Appointed, Bishop of Pamplona)
Juan Juániz de Echalar (16 Dec 1647 – 13 Oct 1656 Died)
Martín López de Hontiveros (18 Jun 1657 – 30 Sep 1658 Confirmed, Archbishop of Valencia)
Fernando Heras Manrique (2 Dec 1658 – 1659 Died)
Bernardo de Hontiveros, O.S.B. (9 Jun 1659 – 3 Nov 1662 Died)
José de la Peña García de Ceniceros (27 Aug 1663 – 23 May 1667 Died)
Francisco Rodríguez Castañón (12 Dec 1667 – 1669 Died)
Gabriel de Esparza Pérez (2 Jun 1670 – 10 Jan 1686 Died)
Pedro de Lepe Orantes (Lope y Dorantes) (12 Aug 1686 – 5 Dec 1700 Died)
Francisco Antonio de Borja-Centelles y Ponce de Léon (18 Jul 1701 – 3 Apr 1702 Appointed, Archbishop of Burgos)
Ildefonso de Mena y Borja (8 May 1702 – 4 Oct 1714 Died)
Antonio Horcasitas y Avellaneda (18 Mar 1715 – 21 Dec 1716 Died)
José Espejo y Cisneros (2 Jul 1717 – 8 Apr 1747 Retired)
Diego Rojas y Contreras (6 May 1748 – 12 Mar 1753 Appointed, Bishop of Cartagena (en España))
Andrés Porras y Termes (26 Sep 1753 – 16 Jun 1764 Died)
Juan Luengo Pinto (17 Dec 1764 – 17 Apr 1784 Died)
Pedro Luis Ozta Múzquiz (27 Jun 1785 – 20 Jan 1789 Died)
Francisco Mateo Aguiriano Gómez † (29 Mar 1790 – 21 Sep 1813 Died)
Atanasio Puyal y Poveda (26 Sep 1814 – 21 Oct 1827 Died)
Ignacio Ribes Mayor (15 Dec 1828 – 24 Feb 1832 Confirmed, Archbishop of Burgos)
Pablo García Abella, C.O. (15 Apr 1833 – 17 Jan 1848 Confirmed, Archbishop of Valencia)
Gaspar Cos y Soberón (3 Jul 1848 – 15 Dec 1848 Died)
Miguel José Irigoyen (20 May 1850 – 18 Feb 1852 Died)
Cipriano Juárez y Berzosa (27 Sep 1852 – 23 May 1858 Died)
Antolín Monescillo y Viso (22 Jul 1861 – 27 Mar 1865 Confirmed, Bishop of Jaén)
Fabián Sebastián Arenzana y Magdaleno (25 Sep 1865 – 9 Nov 1874 Died)
Gabino Catalina y del Amo (5 Jul 1875 – 11 Jan 1882 Died)
Antonio María Cascajares y Azara (27 Mar 1884 – 17 Dec 1891 Confirmed, Archbishop of Valladolid)
Fidel García Martínez (25 Aug 1927 – 7 May 1953 Resigned)

Since 1953
Abilio del Campo y de la Bárcena (7 May 1953 – 20 December 1976 Resigned)
Francisco Alvarez Martínez (20 December 1976 – 12 May 1989 Appointed, Bishop of Orihuela-Alicante)
Ramón Búa Otero (14 September 1989 – 15 September 2003 Resigned)
Juan José Omella Omella (8 April 2004 – 6 November 2015 Appointed, Archbishop of Barcelona)
Carlos Manuel Escribano Subías (13 May 2016 – 6 October 2020 Appointed, Archbishop of Zaragoza)
Santos Montoya Torres (12 January 2022 – present)

Auxiliary
Cristóforo Chrisostome Carletti, O.F.M. (1624–1627)
Abilio del Campo y de la Bárcena (29 Oct 1952 – 7 May 1953, Appointed Bishop of Calahorra y La Calzada)

See also
Roman Catholicism in Spain

References

External links
 GCatholic.org
 Catholic Hierarchy 
 Diocese website
 Página de Calahorra

Roman Catholic dioceses in Spain
Dioceses established in the 5th century